Amy Veness (26 February 1876 – 22 September 1960) was an English film actress. She played the role of Grandma Huggett in The Huggetts Trilogy and was sometimes credited as Amy Van Ness.

Veness was born Amy Clarice Beart in Aldeburgh, Suffolk. She was married to Basil Springett. On 22 September 1960 she died in Saltdean, Sussex, England at age 84.

Selected filmography

 Please Help Emily (1917) - Mrs. Lethbridge
 My Wife (1918) - Mrs. Hammond
 The Brat (1919) - Mrs. Forrester
 The Wife's Family (1931) - Arabella Nagg
 Hobson's Choice (1931) - Mrs. Hepworth
 Tonight's the Night (1932) - Emily Smithers
 Murder on the Second Floor (1932) - (uncredited)
 Money for Nothing (1932) - Emma Bolt
 Self Made Lady (1932) - Old Sookey
 The Marriage Bond (1932) - Mrs. Crust
 Pyjamas Preferred (1932) - Mme. Gautier
 Let Me Explain, Dear (1932) - Aunt Fanny
 Red Wagon (1933) - Petal Schultze
 The Love Nest (1933) - Ma
 Their Night Out (1933) - Gertrude Bunting
 Hawley's of High Street (1933) - Mrs. Hawley
 A Southern Maid (1934) - Donna Rosa
 The Old Curiosity Shop (1934) - Mrs. Jarley
 Lorna Doone (1934) - Betty Muxworthy
 Brewster's Millions (1935) - Mrs. Barry
 Drake of England (1935) - Mother Moore
 Joy Ride (1935) - Lady Clara Mutch-Twistleton
 Play Up the Band (1935) - Lady Heckdyke
 Royal Cavalcade (1935)
 The Beloved Vagabond (1936) - Cafe Owner
 Crime Over London (1936)
 Windbag the Sailor (1936) - Emma Harbottle
 The Mill on the Floss (1936) - Mrs. Deane
 Skylarks (1936)
 King of Hearts (1936) - Mrs. Ponsonby
 Black Roses (1936) - Annushka
 Aren't Men Beasts! (1937) - Mrs. Flower
 The Show Goes On (1937) - Mrs. Scowcroft, Sally's Mother
 The Angelus (1937) - Mrs. Grimes
 Thistledown (1938) - Mary Glenloch
 Yellow Sands (1938) - Mary Varwell
 Flying Fifty-Five (1939) - Aunt Eliza
 Just William (1940) - Mrs. Bott
 This England (1941) - Jenny
 The Saint Meets the Tiger (1941) - Mrs. Donald Jones
 The Man in Grey (1943) - Mrs. Armstrong (uncredited)
 Millions Like Us (1943) - Mrs. Blythe
 Fanny by Gaslight (1944) - Mrs. Heaviside
 This Happy Breed (1944) - Mrs. Flint
 Don't Take It to Heart (1944) - Cook
 Madonna of the Seven Moons (1945) - Tessa
 The World Owes Me a Living (1945) - Mrs. Waterman (uncredited)
 They Were Sisters (1945) - Mrs. Purley
 Don Chicago (1945) - Bowie Knife Bella
 Carnival (1946) - Aunt Fanny
 The Turners of Prospect Road (1947) - Grandma
 Master of Bankdam (1947) - Mrs. Pilling
 Blanche Fury (1948) - Mrs. Winterbourne
 Good-Time Girl (1948) - Mrs. Chalk
 Oliver Twist (1948) - Mrs. Bedwin
 Bond Street (1948) - Seamstress
 My Brother's Keeper (1948) - Mrs. Gully
 Here Come the Huggetts (1948) - Grandma Huggett
 Vote for Huggett (1949) - Grandma Huggett
 A Boy, a Girl and a Bike (1949) - Grannie
 The Huggetts Abroad (1949) - Grandma
 The Astonished Heart (1950) - Alice Smith
 Madeleine (1950) - Miss Aiken (uncredited)
 Chance of a Lifetime (1950) - Lady Davis
 The Woman with No Name (1950) - Sophie
 Portrait of Clare (1950) - Lady in the Train
 Captain Horatio Hornblower (1951) - Mrs. McPhee (Hornblower's Housekeeper)
 The Magic Box (1951) - Grandmother in Wedding Group
 Tom Brown's Schooldays (1951) - Mrs. Wixie
 Angels One Five (1952) - Aunt Tabitha
 Doctor in the House (1954) - Grandma Cooper (uncredited)
 The Woman for Joe (1955) - Landlady (uncredited) (final film role)

References

External links

1876 births
1960 deaths
English film actresses
English silent film actresses
English stage actresses
People from Aldeburgh
20th-century English actresses
People from Saltdean